Lake Moeris (genitive Μοίριδος) is an ancient lake in the northwest of the Faiyum Oasis,  southwest of Cairo, Egypt.

It persists today as a smaller saltwater lake called Birket Qarun. The lake and surrounding area is a protected area and has been designated as a Ramsar site since 2012.

It is a source for tilapia and other fish from the local area.

The prehistoric mammal Moeritherium was found in this area.

History

When the Mediterranean Sea was a hot dry hollow near the end of the Messinian Salinity Crisis in the late Miocene, Faiyum was a dry hollow, and the Nile flowed past it at the bottom of a canyon (2,400 m deep or more where Cairo is now). After the Mediterranean reflooded at the end of the Miocene, the Nile canyon became an arm of the sea reaching inland farther than Aswan. Over geological time that sea arm gradually filled with silt and became the Nile valley.

Eventually, the Nile valley bed silted up high enough to let the flooding Nile overflow into the Faiyum hollow, making a lake in it. The lake is first recorded from about 3000 BC, around the time of Menes (Narmer); however, for the most part it would only be filled with high flood waters. The lake was bordered by neolithic settlements, and the town of Shedet grew up on the south where the higher ground created a ridge.

In 2300 BC, the waterway from the Nile to the natural lake was widened and deepened to make a canal that now is known as the Bahr Yussef. This project was started by Amenemhat III or perhaps by his father Senusret III. This canal fed into the lake. This was meant to serve three purposes: control the flooding of the Nile, regulate the water level of the Nile during dry seasons, and serve the surrounding area with irrigation. There is evidence of ancient Egyptian pharaohs of the twelfth dynasty using the natural lake of Faiyum as a reservoir to store surpluses of water for use during the dry periods.

At the lake there are the remainders of the oldest known paved road in the world, the Lake Moeris Quarry Road, that helped transport basalt blocks from a quarry nearby to the lake, from where they could be shipped to the Giza Necropolis. The American Society of Civil Engineers has entered it into its List of Historic Civil Engineering Landmarks.

The lake is also mentioned by Herodotus in the Histories as situated below the labyrinth of the first gods of Egypt, and opposite the city of Crocodiles (modern city of Fayyum).

The immense waterworks undertaken by the ancient Egyptian pharaohs of the twelfth dynasty to transform the lake into a huge water reservoir gave the impression that the lake was an artificial excavation, as reported by geographers and travellers during classical times. The lake was eventually abandoned due to the nearest branch of the Nile shrinking from 230 BC.

Etymology
 
The name Moeris is a Greek version (reformed as if from Greek Μοῖραι "the Fates") from Egyptian mer-wer 'great canal'. Amenemhat III, who started this project, was also known as Moeris. In ancient Egypt, the lake was also variously called 'the lake', 'pure lake', and 'Osiris' lake'. During the Middle Kingdom, the whole area around the lake was often referred to as mer-wer as well. Similarly, the Late Egyptian word Piom 'sea', originally restricted to Lake Moeris, came to be used to refer to the city of Crocodilopolis (modern Faiyum), then to the entire region in later times.

Notes

References
Fayum Project, University of Leuven
The Hydraulics of Open Channel Flow: An Introduction
Attribution

External links
 
 

Faiyum Governorate
Moeris
Moeris
National parks of Egypt
Geography of ancient Egypt
Ramsar sites in Egypt